Biodiversity Heritage Sites are notified areas of biodiversity importance in India.

The Indian State Government can notify the Biodiversity Heritage Sites in consultation with local governing bodies under Section 37 of Biological Diversity Act of 2002. These areas are considered unique and fragile ecosystems. They can be either terrestrial, coastal and inland waters or marine ecosystems.

Gujarat

Himachal Pradesh

Karnataka

Kerala

Madhya Pradesh

Maharashtra

Punjab 
List of Biodiversity Heritage Sites in Punjab

Odisha 
List of Biodiversity Heritage Sites in Odisha

Rajasthan

West Bengal

In other states

References 

Biodiversity Heritage Sites